Home is the tenth novel by the American author Toni Morrison, originally published in 2012 by Alfred A. Knopf. It tells the story of Frank Money, a 24-year-old African-American veteran of the Korean War, and his journey home "a year after being discharged from an integrated Army into a segregated homeland."

Reception
Home received mixed, but mostly positive, reviews. In a starred review, Publishers Weekly described Morrison's novel as "[b]eautiful, brutal, as is Morrison's perfect prose." Writing in The New York Times, Leah Hager Cohen criticized the lack of subtlety in the novel's symbolism, but concluded: "This work's accomplishment lies in its considerable capacity to make us feel that we are each not only resident but co-owner of, and collectively accountable for, this land we call home." In a review for The Washington Post, Ron Charles wrote: "This scarily quiet tale packs all the thundering themes Morrison has explored before. She’s never been more concise, though, and that restraint demonstrates the full range of her power."
Erich Schwartzel, of the Pittsburgh Post-Gazette, noted flashes of "beautiful, tactile writing", but characterized Home as "an easy narrative that...never finds a resplendence to place it alongside [Morrison's] better, more realized work."

References

External links
 Publisher's page

2012 American novels
Novels by Toni Morrison
Alfred A. Knopf books
African-American novels